Enkaspor is a multi-sports club established in 1983 in Istanbul, Turkey by the Turkish construction conglomerate Enka Construction Co.

Enkaspor's main activities are in athletics, water polo, tennis and swimming with 353 women and 467 men in active sport as of December 2010.

Facilities
Sports facilities of the club are situated within the Sadi Gülçelik Sport Complex stretching over  land located in İstinye neighborhood of Sarıyer district in Istanbul. There are
 one athletics field with six tartan tracks,
 one multi-purpose arena consisting of
 three basketball, volleyball or handball halls,
 one olympic-size swimming pool, which can be covered in the winter time,
 a semi-olympic size covered swimming pool,
 a covered 12-lane swimming and water polo pool,
 12 tennis courts: six training courts of which four can be covered, two open and three covered tennis courts.

Athletics

Sportspeople
Enkaspor played a leading role in bringing talented foreign athletes into Turkey. Elvan Abeylegesse, Anzhela Atroshchenko, Sviatlana Sudak and Alemitu Bekele are sportspeople, who were gained to compete successfully at international events for Turkey.

Many members of Enkaspor are holder of Turkish national records in their branch.

Team achievements
2010
 Senior men Turkey champion
 Senior women Turkey champion
 Junior men Turkey runner-up
 Junior women Turkey runner-up

Notable sportspeople
Swimming
Yiğit Aslan (born 2004), freestyle swimmer
Beril Böcekler (born 2004), female freestyle swimmer
Viktoriya Zeynep Güneş (born 1998), female swimmer of Uktainian origin
Merve Tuncel (born 2005) female freestyle swimmer

Tennis
Çağla Büyükakçay - The first Turkish woman tennis player in singles to play Grand Slam qualification tournament (2010 US Open) and win a WTA singles title (2016 Istanbul Cup)
Melis Sezer - The first Turkish junior woman tennis player to compete in Wimbledon, US and Australia Open tournaments
Ipek Soylu - Tennis player winner of the 2016 WTA Elite Trophy

Track and field
Elvan Abeylegesse - 2010 European champion in 10,000 m and silver medalist in 5,000 m.
Meryem Akda - 3000 m steeplechase and 5000 m runner.
Meryem Bekmez (born 2000), race walker
Yasemin Can - long-distance runner.
Tuğba Danışmaz (born 1999), long jump and triple jump athlete
Evin Demir (born 2001), race walker
Binnaz Uslu - 2010 European silver medalist in cross country. Gold medalist at the 2011 Universiade in 3,000 m steeplechase and 5,000 m.
Pınar Saka -  400 m runner 
Merve Aydın - 800 m runner
Wrestling
Mehlika Öztürk, freestyle

References

Sports clubs established in 1983
 
Athletics clubs in Turkey
Running clubs in Turkey
Sport in Istanbul
Multi-sport clubs in Turkey
Basketball teams in Turkey
Defunct basketball teams in Turkey
Water polo clubs in Turkey
1983 establishments in Turkey
Volleyball clubs in Istanbul